So Friday Night, So Friday Tight is the debut EP by The Friday Night Boys produced by Sean Small. It was released in 2007.

Track listing

2007 debut EPs
The Friday Night Boys albums